Capellinia doriae is a species of sea slug or nudibranch, a marine gastropod mollusc in the family Eubranchidae.

Distribution
This species was described from Genova, Italy. It has also been reported in error from the Atlantic coast of France and the coasts of Great Britain and Ireland but these records refer to a closely related species, Capellinia fustifera.

References

 Trinchese S., 1874: Intorno ai generi Hermaeina e Acanthopsole; Memorie dell'Accademia delle Scienze dell'Istituto di Bologna (3) 5: 73-80 pl. 1
 Trinchese S., 1877-1879: Aeolididae e famiglie affini del Porto di Genova. Parte Prima. Atlante Bologna pp. 94 + 35pl.
 Picton B.E. & Morrow C.C., 1994: A Field Guide to the Nudibranchs of the British Isles.; Immel Publishing LtId., London, page 114.
 Gofas, S.; Le Renard, J.; Bouchet, P. (2001). Mollusca. in: Costello, M.J. et al. (Ed.) (2001). European register of marine species: a check-list of the marine species in Europe and a bibliography of guides to their identification. Collection Patrimoines Naturels. 50: pp. 180–213

Eubranchidae
Gastropods described in 1874